Honduras competed at the 1984 Summer Olympics in Los Angeles, United States.  The nation returned to the Olympic Games after participating in the American-led boycott of the 1980 Summer Olympics.

Results by event

Athletics
Men's Marathon
 Carlos Avila
Final — 2:42:03 (→ 71st place)

Men's 20 km Walk
 Santiago Folseca
 Final — 1:34:47 (→ 31st place)

Women's Marathon 
 Leda Díaz de Cano 
 Final — did not finish (→ no ranking)

Swimming
Men's 100m Freestyle 
Rodolfo Torres
 Heat — 1:00.92 (→ did not advance, 64th place)

Men's 200m Freestyle 
Juan José Piro
 Heat — 2:12.51 (→ did not advance, 52nd place)

Men's 100m Backstroke 
David Palma
 Heat — 1:13.28 (→ did not advance, 43rd place)

Men's 200m Backstroke 
Juan José Piro
 Heat — 2:32.48 (→ did not advance, 34th place)

Men's 100m Breaststroke
Salvador Corelo
 Heat — DSQ (→ did not advance, no ranking)

Men's 200m Breaststroke 
David Palma
 Heat — 2:37.65 (→ did not advance, 42nd place)

Men's 100m Butterfly
Salvador Corelo
 Heat — 1:05.91 (→ did not advance, 49th place)

Men's 200m Butterfly
Juan José Piro
 Heat — 2:22.80 (→ did not advance, 33rd place)

Men's 200m Individual Medley
Salvador Corelo
 Heat — 2:22.29 (→ did not advance, 36th place)

Men's 400m Individual Medley
Juan José Piro
 Heat — 5:15.68 (→ did not advance, 23rd place)

Men's 4 × 100 m Freestyle Relay 
Salvador Covelo, Juan José Piro, David Palma, and Rodolfo Torres
 Heat — 3:55.87 (→ did not advance, 22nd place)

Men's 4 × 100 m Medley Relay
Salvador Corelo, David Palma, Juan José Piro, and Rodolfo Torres
 Heat — 4:22.72 (→ did not advance, 20th place)

Women's 100m Freestyle
María Lardizajal
 Heat — 1:07.80 (→ did not advance, 45th place)

Women's 200m Freestyle
María Lardizajal
 Heat — 2:28.25 (→ did not advance, 36th place)

References
Official Olympic Reports

Nations at the 1984 Summer Olympics
1984
1984 in Honduran sport